Andrew Mark Jones (born 9 January 1963) is a former Wales international footballer. A striker, he won six caps at international level and scored one goal. In domestic football he made 336 league and cup appearances in the English Football League and scored 116 goals.

After failing to make an impact at Wrexham, Jones found massive success in Welsh football with Rhyl. This earned him a chance in the English leagues with Port Vale in 1985. He took this chance in fine style, scoring 49 goals in 90 league appearances, helping the club to promotion out of the Fourth Division in 1985–86, and earning himself the club's Player of the Year award in 1986–87. His goal tally won him a £350,000 move to Charlton Athletic in September 1987. However, he did not find success at Charlton, and was loaned back to Port Vale and then to Bristol City. In October 1990 he signed with Bournemouth, before he moved on to his final club Leyton Orient a year later.

Club career
Jones played youth football in Wales for Ysgol Y, Berwyn, Bala Town, Wrexham and finally Rhyl in the Northern Premier League, before being bought by manager John Rudge at English Fourth Division side Port Vale for a £3,000 fee in May 1985. After hearing that Arsenal had offered Jones a trial, Rudge drove over to Rhyl to put a contract in front of Jones before he had the chance to go to Highbury. He quickly became a regular in the squad and was the Vale's top-scorer in 1985–86 with eighteen goals, his strike partnership with Robbie Earle helping the club win promotion to the Third Division. One of his goals came against top-flight West Bromwich Albion in a 2–2 draw at The Hawthorns in the League Cup.

He enhanced his growing reputation in the 1986–87 season, again top marksman with 37 goals (a post-World War II club record); his 27 league goals made him the most prolific scorer outside of the First Division (where Clive Allen scored 33 for Tottenham Hotspur). Jones scored twelve of his goals from the penalty spot, missing just three in the campaign; throughout his career at Vale Park he scored 20 of his 23 penalties in competitive games – an all-time club record. He scored a brace in eight games, bagged a hat-trick against Fulham at Craven Cottage, and hit five past Newport County at Vale Park. His goalscoring exploits made him an obvious winner for the club's Player of the Year award.

He continued his scoring form into 1987–88, hitting four past Aldershot on the opening day of the season. Further strikes against York City and Chesterfield took him to six goals in eight games. In September 1987, First Division Charlton Athletic broke Vale's transfer record when manager Lennie Lawrence paid £350,000 for Jones's services, after Alex Ferguson had unsuccessfully tried to sign him for Manchester United. However his time with the "Addicks" was not a success – symbolised by a miss against Liverpool a mere four yards from the goal.

Charlton avoided the relegation play-offs in 1987–88 after finishing ahead of Chelsea on goal difference, Jones scoring six goals in 25 league games. However, by 1988–89, Charlton were willing to sell Jones back to Port Vale for a £175,000 fee, but the striker refused the move. He did though agree to return to Vale on loan for four months in the latter half of the season. He hit three goals in seventeen games before returning to Charlton before the play-off win over Bristol Rovers. Jones scored four goals in nine league games for Charlton in 1988–89, and also played four games on loan at Bristol City. Charlton were relegated in 1989–90, with Jones scoring five goals in 25 games.

After seven Second Division games with a goal in 1990–91, he transferred to Third Division Bournemouth in October 1990. He scored eight goals in forty league games, and Harry Redknapp's "Cherries" missed out on the play-offs by six points. He moved on to league rivals Leyton Orient in 1991–92, as the club posted a tenth-place finish. Orient missed out on the play-offs in 1992–93, finishing behind Stockport County on goal difference. He scored thirteen goals in 59 league games for Orient. Jones later played for non-league sides Poole Town and Havant Town.

International career
Jones made his international debut as Ian Rush's strike partner on 1 April 1987 against Finland at the Racecourse Ground in his home town of Wrexham. The Welsh recorded a 4–0 victory, with Jones scoring one goal on the volley. After his debut he paid tribute to the Port Vale fans who had travelled to the game to support him. He played the rest of the five games in the unsuccessful Euro qualification campaign, making three appearances from the bench. Wales drew 1–1 with Czechoslovakia at Wrexham and beat Denmark at Cardiff City's Ninian Park, but were defeated at Copenhagen and Prague. Had they drawn in Denmark or beaten Czechoslovakia home or away then the Welsh would have qualified for Euro 1988. Jones made his sixth and final appearance for Wales against the Netherlands on 11 October 1989, the Dutch winning 2–1, and ending Welsh hopes of qualification out of Group 4 at the 1990 FIFA World Cup qualification stage.

Style of play
A pacey goalscoring striker, he had fantastic shooting ability despite weakness with his touch and linking play.

Post-retirement
After leaving the game due to injury, Jones became a financial advisor. He worked as a rep for the Mizuno Corporation and spent time as a network specialist at BT. He later took up residency in Ringwood, working as a director of his own food waste recycling company.

Career statistics

Club statistics
Source:

International statistics

Honours
Individual
Port Vale F.C. Player of the Year: 1986–87

Port Vale
Football League Fourth Division fourth-place finish (promoted): 1985–86

References

External links
 
 An interview with Andy Jones at onevalefan.co.uk

1963 births
Living people
Footballers from Wrexham
Welsh footballers
Wales international footballers
Association football forwards
Bala Town F.C. players
Wrexham A.F.C. players
Rhyl F.C. players
Port Vale F.C. players
Charlton Athletic F.C. players
Bristol City F.C. players
AFC Bournemouth players
Leyton Orient F.C. players
Poole Town F.C. players
Havant Town F.C. players
Northern Premier League players
English Football League players
Southern Football League players
British Telecom people